The 2000 State of the Union Address was given by the 42nd president of the United States, Bill Clinton, on January 27, 2000, at 9:00 p.m. EST, in the chamber of the United States House of Representatives to the 106th United States Congress. It was Clinton's seventh and final State of the Union Address and his eighth and final speech to a joint session of the United States Congress. Presiding over this joint session was the House speaker, Dennis Hastert, accompanied by Al Gore, the vice president, in his capacity as the president of the Senate.

Clinton began the speech by saying, "We are fortunate to be alive at this moment in history. Never before has our nation enjoyed, at once, so much prosperity and social progress with so little internal crisis or so few external threats. Never before have we had such a blessed opportunity and, therefore, such a profound obligation to build the more perfect union of our founders' dreams." Clinton discussed many topics in the address, including education, health care, crime, the global economy, technology, and the environment.

It was the longest State of the Union address in recorded history at 1 hour and 28 minutes.

This State of the Union address is notable for being the first since President Reagan's 1986 address at which all 9 members of the Supreme Court were absent.  It is speculated that their absence was due to Clinton's recent impeachment. Bill Richardson, the Secretary of Energy, served as the designated survivor.

See also
2000 United States presidential election

References

External links

State of the Union Address (full transcript), The American Presidency Project, UC Santa Barbara
Entire 2000 State of the Union Response (transcript)
Entire 2000 State of the Union address (video) at C-SPAN
Entire 2000 State of the Union Response (video) at C-SPAN
Entire 2000 State of the Union address (audio)

State of the Union Address 2000
State of the Union Address
State of the Union Address
State of the Union Address
State of the Union Address
Articles containing video clips
State of the Union Address
Presidency of Bill Clinton
State of the Union Address 2000
2000